Ida Gerding Athens (February 23, 1882 – November 4, 1977) was an American author. She wrote a collection of poetry titled Brethren.

Born Ida Bird Gerding in Cleves, Ohio, she came from a poor German-American family.

She was included in the Who's Who of African American Writers because of her candid comments upon racial tension in the United States, perhaps inspired by her own low socio-economic background. Her poetry from the 1930s was discussed by James Edward Smethurst in The New Red Negro: The Literary Left and African-American Poetry, 1930–1946 together with that of Lucy Mae Turner, Frank Marshall Davis, Waring Cuney, Richard Wright and Countée Cullen. Smethurst notes that Gerding Athens appeared to be separated from the mainstream of left-wing African-American literature, yet "manifested important thematic and formal concerns" in her poetry that he considers characteristic of 1930s–40s African-American poetry.

She was supposedly influential in choosing the geranium as Ohio's state flower. 

She married William Wilson Athens II on December 23, 1917, as his second wife. She died in Cincinnati, Ohio.

Publications
Source:
 Brethren, 1940
 John three, sixteen, 1959

References

1882 births
1977 deaths
American women poets
American people of German descent
20th-century American poets
20th-century American women writers
People from Cleves, Ohio